The 2001 FA Trophy Final was the 32nd final of The Football Association's cup competition for levels 5–8 of the English football league system. It was contested by Canvey Island and Forest Green Rovers on 13 May 2001 at Villa Park, Birmingham.

Canvey Island won the match 1-0 thanks to a goal from Ben Chenery in a final held away from the old Wembley Stadium as work was beginning on building the new Wembley Stadium. A crowd of 10,007 were in attendance.

Route to the final

Canvey Island

Forest Green Rovers

Match

Details

References

FA Trophy Finals
FA Trophy Final
Canvey Island F.C. matches
FA Trophy 2001
May 2001 sports events in the United Kingdom